The Pharmacy Building is located at 1601 Southwest Jefferson Avenue on the Oregon State University campus in Corvallis, Oregon, United States.

References

Oregon State University buildings